The Bulacan State University College of Business Administration (Filipino: Pamantasang Pampamahalaan ng Bulacán, Koléhiyó ng Pángasiwaáng Panghanap-buhay) is a college within the BulSU system which offers business and business-related courses. Before the college was established in 2011, the university offered business administration courses through its College of Social Sciences and Philosophy (CSSP). In 2011, however, CSSP was divided into three colleges: CSSP, College of Criminal Justice Administration (CCJE), and CBA. The three colleges continue to share the university's APP Hall.

Structure
From its establishment to 2014, the college offered two programs: accountancy and business administration. The latter is further divided into two majors, namely, management and entrepreneurship. In 2014, however, a year into his term as Dean, Dr. Gualberto Magdaraog, Jr., announced certain crucial changes in program offerings. Entrepreneurship was launched as a separate program. Management majors are divided into Financial Management and Marketing Management. Two new programs were introduced (namely Accounting Technology and Business Economics) to cater those who will not pass the battery exams administered to Accountancy and Management students respectively.

Programs

Area 1: Accountancy and Accounting Technology
Accountancy is a four-year program, the completion of which entitles the student to a degree in accountancy and the right to take the CPA Board Exams administered by the Professional Regulatory Commission. Accounting Technology are for students who failed in the annual qualifying exams. Both courses are trimestral.

In 2015, the College had its first batch of graduates of the accountancy program, most of whom took the licensure exams to become certified public accountants (CPAs). The School was among the top performing schools in the November 2015 board exams, garnering an 80% passing rate, compared to the national passing rate of ~20%. A year later, the second batch were graduated and an accountancy student, Mary Rose Babala, led the graduating class of the entire college, with a record-high GPA that made her the first student of the College to be a President's lister.

Area 2: Financial Management and Business Economics

Area 3: Marketing Management and Entrepreneurship

Bureaucracy

Events 
On May 8, 2019, Bulacan State University – Bustos Campus hosted its 4th Internship Induction Ceremony and Pre-Employment Seminar for their Financial Management and Marketing students. Their resource speakers are Dr. Feliciano B. Santos Jr., In-Plant Training Coordinator, and Mr. Archie B. Patdu, CEO of F&A Hub.

References

Business schools in the Philippines